The Minardi M188 was a Formula One car designed by Giacomo Caliri and Aldo Costa built by Minardi for the 1988 Formula One season. The car was driven by Spanish driver Adrian Campos, Italian Pierluigi Martini, and Spanish driver Luis Pérez-Sala.

In 1988, ahead of the ban in turbo engines for the 1989 season, Minardi changed their engine from the Motori Moderni V6 turbo to the normally aspirated Cosworth DFZ.

Driver Adrian Campos was dismissed after the fifth round of the season due to poor performance and he was replaced by Pierluigi Martini, who previously raced for the team in 1985 and then moved down to International Formula 3000 in 1986. Martini scored the one and only point for Minardi in his first race in Detroit, taking 6th place. The team finished 10th in the constructor's championship.

An upgraded version of the car, dubbed the M188B was used for the first three races of the 1989 season.

Livery 
The M188 retained its black and yellow colour scheme from previous years. Spanish jeans company Lois was the title sponsor for the year.

Complete Formula One World Championship results
(key)

* All points scored using the Minardi M189

References

Minardi Formula One cars